Geoffrey Stephen Christie (born November 13, 1967) is a former Canadian American football placekicker in the National Football League (NFL), who, as a member of the Buffalo Bills, became known for his ability to kick clutch field goals, even in poor weather.

Professional career

Early career
Christie, who grew up in Oakville, Ontario, graduated from The College of William and Mary and made his NFL debut with the Tampa Bay Buccaneers in 1990. He made all 27 extra-point attempts and 23 of 27 field goal tries in his rookie season. He would end up playing two years for the Buccaneers.

Buffalo Bills
From 1992 to 2000, Christie kicked for Buffalo. With the Bills, he would become one of the game's top kickers. He was a key contributor in the Bills comeback win against the Houston Oilers, in which Buffalo rallied from a 32-point deficit to complete the largest comeback victory in NFL history. Christie kicked a successful onside kick, which he recovered himself (becoming the first placekicker ever to do so in an NFL playoff game), and also kicked the game-winning 32-yard field goal in overtime. His kicking shoe from that game is displayed in the Pro Football Hall of Fame in Canton. He then went on to kick five field goals in the Bills 29-10 win over the Miami Dolphins in the AFC championship game, helping Buffalo get to their third consecutive Super Bowl.

In 1993, Christie set a Bills record by kicking a 59-yard field goal in a regular-season game. It was only four yards short of the all-time NFL record.

In Super Bowl XXVIII, Christie set a Super Bowl record by kicking a 54-yard field goal. It is currently the longest field goal ever made in Super Bowl History.

In the 2000 season, Christie was an instrumental part of the Bills' eight victories. In week 1 vs. the Tennessee Titans, Christie went 3 for 4 on field-goal attempts (41, 42, & 33 yards). The 33-yard field goal came with just :35 to play, giving the Bills a win over the Titans, who had knocked them out of the playoffs the year before. In week 7 vs. the San Diego Chargers, Christie kicked a 29-yard field goal with just :11 seconds to play, forcing the game into overtime.  Christie then nailed a 46-yard field goal in overtime, giving the Bills their third victory of the season. In week 9 vs. the New York Jets, Christie went 3 for 4 on field-goal attempts (20, 29, & 34 yards). The 34-yard field goal came with just :03 seconds to play, lifting the Bills to 4-4 on the season. In week 10 vs. the New England Patriots, Christie kicked a 48-yard field goal in rainy conditions with just seconds to play, forcing the game into overtime.  Christie then nailed a 32-yard field goal in overtime, sending the Bills to 5-4 on the season.

Before the 2001 regular season, Christie was placed on IR from an offseason groin injury having accuracy problems during the preseason being replaced by Jake Arians prior to the start of the season. Christie eventually got cut on October 4. 

Christie has nine field goals in overtime to his credit, an NFL record he shares with Jason Elam and Jim Breech.

Later career
From 2001 to 2003 he played for the San Diego Chargers, who, with the hire of former Bills GM John Butler, acquired several former Buffalo players.

In 2001, Butler signed Christie on November 28, to replace Wade Richey who was demoted after struggling on field goals.

In 2004, Christie was signed by the Jacksonville Jaguars to put some pressure on struggling rookie Josh Scobee.  Christie requested his release from Jacksonville after a week in camp hoping to retire, but signed with the New York Giants a day later, playing what would be his final NFL season.

In his 15 NFL seasons, Christie converted 336 of 431 (77%) field goals and 468 of 473 (98%) extra points, giving him a total of 1,476 points.

On July 2, 2007, Christie joined the Toronto Argonauts of the Canadian Football League by signing a practice roster agreement with the team. On the signing, Christie pointed out that one reason for joining the team was "basically doing Michael (Clemons) a favour" as a former college teammate and that it was tentatively for one game. The other reason was that as a Canadian citizen, playing one game in the CFL, would be great way to finish his career. Christie was activated to play on July 7, 2007 against the Hamilton Tiger-Cats.

On March 5, 2008 Christie retired from professional football. The Buffalo Bills officially signed Christie to a one-day contract, thus to retire as a Buffalo Bill. He currently resides in Bradenton, Florida, with his wife Kelly and their four daughters.

Career regular season statistics
Career high/best bolded

After football
Christie also served as an analyst for The Score Television Network. He also did color commentary for the University at Buffalo Bulls football team on WECK radio.

Christie is currently President of Relative Goal Sports and Entertainment Management LLC., certified as a Canadian Football League contract advisor and has represented numerous musical acts in both the United States and Scotland.  In 2015 Christie was named Executive Director of Sports at Mastermind Lounge, LLC. He is also a Sales Associate with Charles Rutenberg Realty Inc., Florida, working with his wife, Realtor Kelly Christie.

In 2014, Christie was diagnosed with colorectal cancer. After chemotherapy and radiation treatments in Buffalo, he underwent two successful surgeries at the Cleveland Clinic in Cleveland, Ohio.

References

External links
 Toronto Argonauts profile
 ESPN.com profile
 Q & A with Steve Christie

1967 births
Living people
American football placekickers
Canadian expatriate American football people in the United States
Canadian football placekickers
Canadian players of American football
Players of Canadian football from Ontario
Canadian television sportscasters
Sportspeople from Hamilton, Ontario
People from Oakville, Ontario
Tampa Bay Buccaneers players
Buffalo Bills players
San Diego Chargers players
Jacksonville Jaguars players
New York Giants players
Toronto Argonauts players
William & Mary Tribe football players